2 Sextantis is a single star that is now in the equatorial constellation Hydra, located around 295 light years away from the Sun. It is visible to the naked eye as a faint, orange-hued star with an apparent visual magnitude of 4.68. This object is moving further from the Earth with a heliocentric radial velocity of +44.6 km/s.

This is a giant star with a stellar classification of K3 III, which, at the age of 4.58 billion years old, has exhausted the hydrogen at its core and evolved away from the main sequence. The star has 1.32 times the mass of the Sun and has expanded to 24 times the Sun's radius. It is radiating 190.5 times the luminosity of the Sun from its enlarged photosphere at an effective temperature of 4,188 K.

References

K-type giants
Hydra (constellation)
Durchmusterung objects
Sextantis, 02
083425
047310
3834